Oasis, California may refer to:

 Oasis, Mendocino County, California
 Oasis, Mono County, California
 Oasis, Riverside County, California